Rivers Academy West London is an 11–18 mixed secondary school and sixth form with academy status in Feltham, London, England. It specialises in business and enterprise. The school opened replacing Longford Community School. It is a part of the multi-academy trust, Aspirations Academies Trust.

References

External links 
 

Secondary schools in the London Borough of Hounslow
Academies in the London Borough of Hounslow
Educational institutions established in 2011
2011 establishments in England